Radcliffe is a surname.  Notable people with the name include:

 Alex Radcliffe (1905–1983), US baseball player
 Ann Radcliffe (1764–1823), English novelist
 Aubrey Radcliffe (1933–2009), US academic
 Charles Radcliffe (born 1941), English magazine editor
 Cyril Radcliffe, 1st Viscount Radcliffe (1899–1977), British lawyer
 Daniel Radcliffe (born 1989), English actor
 Egremont Radcliffe (died 1578), English rebel
 Eric Radcliffe, British recording engineer and music producer
 George Radcliffe (politician) (1593–1657), English politician
 George L. P. Radcliffe (1877–1974), US Senator from Maryland
 Jacob Radcliff (1764–1844), US politician
 John Radcliffe, disambiguation
 Mark Radcliffe, disambiguation
 Mary Radcliffe, disambiguation
 Melva Radcliffe (1901–2012), supercentenarian from in New Jersey
 Mike Radcliffe (born 1944), Canadian politician
 Paula Radcliffe (born 1973), English athlete
 Richard Radcliffe (died 1660), English politician who sat in the House of Commons in 1656
 Rip Radcliff (1906–1962), American baseball player
 Rosemary Radcliffe (born 1949), Canadian actress
 Ted Radcliffe (1902–2005), US baseball player
 Timothy Radcliffe (born 1945), former Master of the Order of Preachers (Dominicans) 1992–2001